Scott W. Rothstein (born June 10, 1962) is an American disbarred lawyer, convicted felon, and the former managing shareholder, chairman, and chief executive officer of the now-defunct Rothstein Rosenfeldt Adler law firm. He funded an extravagant lifestyle with a $1.2 billion Ponzi scheme, one of the largest such in history. 

On December 1, 2009, Rothstein turned himself in to authorities and was subsequently arrested on charges related to the Racketeer Influenced and Corrupt Organizations Act (RICO).
Although his arraignment plea was not guilty, Rothstein reversed his plea to guilty of five federal crimes on January 27, 2010.
Rothstein was denied bond by U.S. Magistrate Judge Robin Rosenbaum, who ruled that due to his ability to forge documents, he was considered a flight risk. He was sentenced to 50 years in federal prison.

Overview 

On June 9, 2010, Rothstein received a 50-year prison sentence after a hearing in federal court in Fort Lauderdale, although federal prosecutors initially filed a motion notifying the court they would be seeking a sentence reduction for Rothstein.

His firm had 70 lawyers and 150 employees, with offices in Boca Raton, West Palm Beach, Fort Lauderdale, Miami, Tallahassee, Florida, New York City and Caracas, Venezuela. The firm focused on labor and employment matters, civil rights, intellectual property, internet law, corporate espionage, personal injury, wrongful death, commercial litigation, real estate, mergers and acquisitions, and governmental relations. His client list included Citicorp, J. C. Penney, Ed Morse Automotive Group, National Beverage, Silversea Cruise Lines, Supra Telecom, and Wells Fargo. Until he was permanently disbarred by the Florida Supreme Court on November 25, 2009, Rothstein was a member of the Florida Bar and admitted by the United States Supreme Court. He had been given an AV Preeminent peer review rating by Martindale-Hubbell.

On November 3, 2009, Federal Bureau of Investigation and United States Department of the Treasury agents served a warrant to search the firm's Fort Lauderdale offices. Rothstein sent an email in recent weeks to firm lawyers asking them to investigate which countries refused to extradite criminal suspects to either the U.S. or Israel, and firm lawyers responded that Morocco is one such country. Rothstein had wired $16 million to an individual in Casablanca
and left for Casablanca on October 26, 2009. On October 31, 2009, he sent a suicide text message note to all of his law partners:Sorry for letting you all down. I am a fool. I thought I could fix it, but got trapped by my ego and refusal to fail, and now all I have accomplished is hurting the people I love. Please take care of yourselves and please protect Kimmie [Rothstein's wife]. She knew nothing. Neither did she, nor any of you deserve what I did. I hope God allows me to see you on the other side. Love, Scott.

On November 3, 2009, after many texts from Stuart Rosenfeldt, the president of the firm, urging him to "choose life", Rothstein returned to Fort Lauderdale on a chartered jet,  from Casablanca. On November 2, his law firm with only $117,000 in its operating account filed suit against him, asked a judge to dissolve the firm, accusing him of misappropriating hundreds of millions of dollars from investor trust accounts in a Ponzi scheme from an investment business he covertly ran out of his law office.

In 2009, Rothstein resided at the Federal Detention Center, Miami in Downtown Miami, but was later moved to an undisclosed location and his inmate number removed from the Federal Bureau of Prisons inmate locator webpage.

Background and career 
Rothstein was born in the Bronx and moved with his parents to Lauderhill, Florida as a teenager. A 1988 Juris Doctor graduate of Fort Lauderdale's Nova Southeastern University's Law School, the Shepard Broad College of Law, and a 1984 Bachelor of Arts graduate of University of Florida, Rothstein's law career began in 1988 and, for nearly fifteen years, he was relatively unknown. In the early 1990s, Rothstein first partnered with attorney Howard Kusnick. First located in Plantation, Florida, Kusnick & Rothstein, P.A. subsequently moved to Ft. Lauderdale. In 2000, Rothstein joined with Rosenfeldt as a name partner at the Hollywood firm, Phillips Eisinger Koss & Rosenfeldt, P.A., which became known as Phillips Eisinger Koss Rothstein & Rosenfeldt, P.A.

In February 2002, Rothstein and Rosenfeldt started their own firm, first known as Rothstein & Rosenfeldt, P.A. Within a month, Pancier was added as a name partner. In July, 2002, adding Susan Dolin, a well-regarded employment lawyer, the firm became known as Rothstein, Rosenfeldt, Dolin & Pancier, P.A. In late 2004, the firm became known simply as Rothstein Rosenfeldt, with Adler being added in March 2005. Melissa Britt Lewis, who was murdered in March, 2008, was with Rothstein from the firm's beginning.

In seven years, he and his partners expanded the firm to 70 lawyers, including former Boca Raton Mayor and sitting Palm Beach County Commissioner Steve Abrams; former judges Julio Gonzalez, Barry Stone, and former Palm Beach circuit judge, William Berger; TV and radio legal commentator and former prosecutor, Ken Padowitz; Carlos Reyes, former South Broward Hospital District commissioner and lobbyist; Arthur Neiwirth, a bankruptcy expert; and Les Stracher, former legal counsel for Morse Auto Group, who represents major auto dealers.

Recent 
On September 8, 2011, U.S. District Judge James I. Cohn granted the government's motion to prohibit videotaping Rothstein during a scheduled deposition of him, citing "serious harm" and "security reasons that are unusual in nature." The exact reasons for the judge's decision were sealed.

On June 8, 2011, federal prosecutors filed a motion with the sentencing judge informing him that they would be asking for a sentence reduction for Rothstein. However, on September 26, 2017, prosecutors withdrew their motion for a reduced sentence, saying that he had provided "false material information" in violation of his plea agreement.

Appointment
In August 2008, Governor Crist appointed Rothstein as a member of the 4th District Court of Appeal Judicial nominating commission, a body which is responsible for selecting new judges for appointment to the Court.

Personal life
An observant Jew, Rothstein grew up in a small Bronx apartment, sharing a bedroom with his sister. His father was a salesman "back in the days when you carried a bag up and down the streets of New York." The family moved to Lauderhill, Florida in 1977. His grandmother used her life savings to help put him through school. "I grew up poor. I'm a lunatic about money."

Rothstein was a large contributor to a synagogue off Las Olas with his name affixed to the front facade: The Rothstein Family Downtown Jewish Center Chabad. Rabbi Schneur Kaplan is one of the two people who talked Rothstein out of committing suicide.

He invested in residential property. In 2003, he paid $1.2 million for an intracoastal waterfront house on Castilla Isle in Fort Lauderdale. In March 2005, he bought a neighboring home belonging to Miami Dolphins' Ricky Williams for $2.73 million. While living in Williams' old house, he purchased two other homes on the street and three other homes in Broward for a total residential investment of nearly $20 million. "They call me the king of Castilla."

In 2008, he purchased a $6.45 million waterfront gated Fort Lauderdale home, a $6 million condo in New York in the same building as Marc Dreier,
and a $2.8 million oceanfront estate in Narragansett, Rhode Island.

His second wife, Kimberly Wendell Rothstein, a 35-year-old real-estate agent, helped manage his properties, which also include part-ownership of an office building in Pompano Beach. He and Bova also owned Bova Ristorante, formerly long-time generational Italian family-owned Mario's of Boca, which shut down October 18, 2009. Bova Prime, formerly Riley McDermott's, on Las Olas Boulevard is still operating. On September 11, 2008, the day before Rothstein took ownership, a dispute involving firearms broke out at Riley McDermott's involving Rothstein's security personnel.

He owns parts of an internet technology called company Qtask and V Georgio Spirits Co., LLC with CEO Vie Harvey and the Renato watch company, with partner, Ovi Levy.
Levy is the son of hotelier Shimon Levy, who spent a year in prison in Israel after hiding a criminal kingpin, suspected of two murders.

Rothstein at one time was a minority shareholder of Edify LLC, a health-care benefits consulting company. State Representative Evan Jenne-D-Dania Beach is a $30,000 company consultant, who previously worked a local bank. Rothstein hired Jenne's father, former sheriff and convicted felon, Ken Jenne, as a consultant at his law firm days after Jenne was released from prison on corruption charges. An attorney for Rothstein's law firm serves as the registered agent for Evan Jenne's company, Blue Banyan. Grant Smith, a lifelong friend of Evan Jenne's, is an Edify lobbyist. Edify has worked closely with the state Department of Health to develop wellness programs and also influences certain health-care legislation.

"The Great Gatsby" 
In the 2008 interview at his law firm, Rothstein described himself and told how he controlled all aspects of the firm's management:
This is where the evil happens. Look, I sleep in the bed I make. I tend toward the flashy side, but it's a persona. It's just a fucking persona. ... People ask me, 'When do you sleep?' I say I'll sleep when I'm dead. I'm a true Gemini. I joke around that there are 43 people living in my head and you never know what you're going to get. There are some philanthropists in there, some good lawyers, and I like to think some good businessmen. There are also some guys from the streets of the Bronx that stay hidden away until I need them. Does that sound crazy? I am crazy, but crazy in a good way.

His personal office was opulent, with security and a compartmentalized layout. Anyone entering Rothstein's suite of offices had to use an intercom. He could exit, unseen through a second door. In the hallway, an ordinary looking brown door is actually the elevator door. Dozens of surveillance cameras and microphones hang from office ceilings. On his desk: four computer screens and the Five Books of Moses.
He had a Boeing 727 jet and in 2002, flew Bill Clinton, Kevin Spacey, and Chris Tucker to Africa on an anti-AIDS mission. He owned an  $5 million Warren yacht. His fleet of exotic cars included: 1974, 2006, 2007, and 2008 Ferraris, 2009 Bentley, 2007 Silver Rolls-Royce, and one 2008 and two 2010 Lamborghini Murcielagos — worth about $400,000 each, a pair of $1.6 million Bugattis, and a pair of Harleys which he maintains in an air-conditioned warehouse.
All were allegedly purchased and traded from Euromotorsports, the owner of which has an extensive criminal record.
All were seized shortly after his return from Morocco. He has a watch collection of over 100, valued at $1 million. In 2008, he was working on opening a cigar and martini bar on Las Olas Boulevard and two high-rise residential buildings in Brooklyn with New York partner Dominic Tonnachio. He was to take ownership of a "series of office buildings" on Oakland Park Boulevard.

Roger Stone was a partner with Rothstein in RRA Consulting, an LLC which was set up to provide public affairs assistance to the RRA law firm's legal clients. According to Stone, that business never generated any clients. It was dissolved in late 2008. On August 27, 2009, Stone, the recipient of Rothstein's sponsorship of his blog until July 29, 2009, "StoneZone", wrote a column recommending Rothstein for the seat vacated by Senator Mel Martinez - a man with "a distinguished legal record, has been a key supporter of Governor Crist and John McCain, has an unmatched record of philanthropic activities and would bring an unconventional style of getting things done to Washington. Add Rothstein to the short list." On November 4, 2009, Stone wrote, "Rothstein had no prior business success, no business acumen nor track record that would engender confidence in an investor. He could not read a balance sheet. He could not write or read a business plan. Rothstein was a lawyer, not an entrepreneur." 

Stone claims that Rothstein has Attention Deficit Disorder (ADD) "so severe he never finished a martini, a cigar, a thought, or a sentence, never mind a transaction." According to Stone, neither law firm name partner Russell Adler nor Stuart Rosenfeldt were signatories on the RRA Trust Account.

He "appeared to be something out of a Great Gatsby movie."

Philanthropy and political contributions 
In 2008, his Rothstein Family Foundation gave $1 million to Holy Cross Hospital in Fort Lauderdale, where a lobby was to be named for him and his wife. On October 31, 2009 his firm sponsored at a charity golf tournament featuring former Gov. Jeb Bush.

Between 2007 and 2008, he donated $2 million to the American Heart Association, Women in Distress, Alonzo Mourning Charities, Here's Help, and the Dan Marino Foundation.

Politicians of both parties have pledged to donate to charity or return his political contributions. On November 3, 2009, the Florida Republican Party, announced it would give Rothstein's donations ($600,000) to a charity. Gov. Charlie Crist's Senate Campaign ($100,550), state Chief Financial Officer Alex Sink ($2,050), Senate President Jeff Atwater, Rep. Ellyn Bogdanoff, and that the Florida Democratic Party ($200,000) would return some or all of his contributions.

In June 2009, Harry Reid, the late former Democratic Senate majority leader received a contribution of $4,800. A list of FEC filings indexed by NewsMeat include a total of $166,800 to the Republican Party and candidates, including $109,800 to John McCain's 2008 presidential campaign, and $17,600 to Democratic candidates.

Law partner murder 
Debra Villegas, who handles his money, is the law firm's chief operating officer. She is co-owner with Rothstein in a home at 2307 Castilla Isle, as of May 2009. According to records, Rothstein originally purchased the property in September 2007, for $1.75 million, and sold it for $10 to a shell corporation in September 2009.

In 2005, the year the Ponzi scheme allegedly began, Villegas earned $80,000 a year. In 2007, her salary had increased to $145,000. Villegas received two Swiss watches — a Rolex and a Breitling — from her "employer". Rothstein paid off her couch and a bedroom set and held title to her two Honda water scooters. Villegas was living in a $475,000 Weston home that Rothstein signed over to her in July 2009 for $100 and "love and affection," according to the deed. Villegas registered a 2009 $100,000 Maserati GranTurismo at the home in January, 2009. In November 2009, Federal prosecutors seized the home, alleging that it was among Rothstein's ill-gotten assets.

Villegas' estranged husband, Tony Villegas, was charged on circumstantial evidence in the March 2008 murder in Plantation, Florida of Melissa Britt Lewis, a partner in Rothstein's firm. Although early news reports wondered at whether the evidence was substantial, according to New Times, "Nine days later, forensic testing revealed that Tony's DNA had been found on Melissa's suit jacket – the same jacket she wore on the day she died." Police sealed the arrest affidavit.
Rothstein had a team of "executive protection specialists" to guard the firm and his family, his teen-aged daughter. The prosecutor who had first worked on the Villegas case, Howard Scheinberg, went to work for Rosenfeldt Rothstein Adler. Villegas, a train conductor, remains in jail awaiting trial. Debra and Melissa shared a therapist, Ilene Vinikoor, whose husband, David, represented general counsel, David Boden in the Ponzi scheme investigation.
You get anger from people ... that prick from the Bronx. ... They say I'm building the law firm too fast, that it must be a house of cards.

"Disbarment on consent" 
On November 17, 2009, the Florida Bar Executive Committee voted to accept a request by Rothstein to be disbarred. The Florida Supreme Court entered an order permanently disbarring Rothstein on November 25, 2009. Rothstein was removed from the Broward County Grievance Committee, and his name removed from the database of "The Best Lawyers in America".

Trust account 
Rothstein, Rosenfeldt, and Adler's trust account was part of the Interest on Lawyer Trust Accounts (IOLTA) program that was paying hundreds of thousands of dollars a month to the Florida Bar Foundation.

$1.2 billion Ponzi scheme 
Rothstein's investment scheme involved purchasing what were initially mislabeled as fabricated "structured settlements," described as where people sell large settlements in legal cases for lump sums of cash. Alan Sakowitz, an attorney and real estate developer in Bay Harbor Islands, said that he contacted the FBI in September with concerns about Rothstein.

On Sunday, November 8, 2009, Sakowitz appeared with Kendall Coffey, attorney for Rothstein's law partners, on the Michael Putney Show on WPLG-TV, MIAMI, correcting Coffey for claiming that Rothstein's "investments" involved structured settlements, which they did not. (Note: "structured settlements" as defined by Rothstein in press reports do not meet the definition in IRC 5891(C)(1) of the Internal Revenue Code). Rothstein's resemble investments in pre-settlement funding or pre-settlement financing. In his December 12, 2011 deposition page 24 lines 15-23, Scott Rothstein himself said "It was intentionally made in a way and presented to that firm and the other firms that were looking at the structure issue that it was merely a purchase of dollars already in-house; that it was not a structured settlement because the true definition of a structured settlement is when someone is actually receiving payments over time that has some other value. We didn't have a true definition of a structured settlement, not by any of the statutes. From that perspective we had reason to make sure that this was not structured. Because when you're dealing with structured settlements you need other levels of Court approval. It would have required the manufacturer of literally hundreds of phony orders, which would have led the entire scheme to detection.'

The FBI estimates the loss to be up to a billion dollars from lucrative whistle-blower and employment discrimination cases.
The investors would make up-front cash payments to individuals owed money from the court cases to buy the right to collect the full amount of the settlements later. The investor was guaranteed a minimum of 20 percent investment returns in as little as three months.

Swindle pitch 
General counsel David Boden was present for at least one of the swindles, and negotiated the final papers with the investors' lawyers. Rothstein greets and informs the investor his firm was the preeminent sexual harassment law firm in the country. He says he'd figured out a basic formula which was that someone with $10 million net worth was usually willing to pay $2 million in cash to pay off their mistress. The key was confidentiality. Rothstein tells the investor that he would meet potential defendants in his office and would question them about affairs they had with an employee. The defendants would deny it. He pointed to artwork, and said there was a television screen behind it. He tells the investor he turned on a video of the guy having sex with his mistress, and told his client "We can either settle this now, or I can depose your wife, your mistress, you and your son about it." Since defendants" often couldn't or wouldn't pay the entire settlement up-front, Rothstein tells the investor that his first harassment case many years ago, involved a $3.5 million settlement and a million-dollar legal fee, so Rothstein assigned the settlement to a good friend and the plaintiff settles for $3 million without a trial. The "good friend" stood to be paid $3.5 million once the defendant paid up, a half-million dollar profit.

"In 20 years, I have never seen a defendant sue on breach of settlement," Rothstein told them. "The whole idea is that it's secret. Why would they sue?"

Although it did not appear completely legitimate, and it might have appeared that the plaintiffs were short-changed, it makes sense to the potential investor. The idea seems solid. The investor thinks that with enough of these cases at Rothstein's law firm, he could make huge sums of money.

Rothstein then discusses other larger cases: Eli Lilly and Company, involving $1.4 billion with plaintiff representation by Gary Farmer, a firm attorney who negotiated the settlement and who brought the case with him when he arrived at the firm. Several inside whistleblowers went to the fed with unlawful practices regarding the marketing and sales of an anti-psychotic medication called Zyprexa. It was one of the largest qui tam cases in history.

He tells the investor about a potential (allegedly fabricated) case where investors would buy whistle-blower million dollar settlements with a sixty percent short term investor profit. The arrangement would be completely secret; the investor would never know the name of the company or the whistle-blower. The settlement money would be deposited into a trust account at TD Bank, accessible only to the investor at the appropriate time. David Boden follows up with all questions and negotiates the contract.

Court-appointed receiver 
On November 2, 2009, Broward Chief Judge Vic Tobin sent an e-mail at 6:45 a.m. to judges about the Rothstein case:

I learned of some very distressing news yesterday. Whoever draws the case try to set the motion today because of the amount of clients and money involved. Also, if you have a case with the firm, please be patient. I don't know if the lawyers will come or not and if they do come, there is no money at this point to go forward with the case or pay firm employees.

On November 3, 2009, retired Miami-Dade Circuit Judge Herbert Stettin was appointed the firm's receiver, responsible for approving the firm's day-to-day financial decisions. Firm president and 50% owner of the firm, Stuart Rosenfeldt, "deposited two-thirds of my life savings in my firm's operating account" to prop up finances in the short-term.

Victims 

On November 25, 2009, Attorney William Scherer filed a 289-page Amended Complaint seeking $100,000,000 in civil damages on behalf of his clients, and naming: Toronto Dominion Bank and its associates, Frank Spinosa, Jennifer Kerstetter, and Rosanne Karetsky, Irene Stay, Banyon Income Fund, L.P., Banyon USVI, LLC, George G. Levin, Michael Szafranski, Onyx Options Consultants Corporation, Berenfeld Spritzer Shechter Sheer, LLP., as well as Rothstein and his associates, David Boden, Debra Villegas, Andrew Barnett, and Frank J. Preve, as defendants/co-conspirators.

The Amended Complaint lists people and businesses to whom Rothstein allegedly wired money while he was en route to or inside of Morocco: Rothstein wired $16 million to his tour guide from Boca Raton, Florida, "Ahnick Kahlid". Kahlid transferred the money to Rothstein's new Moroccan bank account opened upon his arrival with a passport as identification at Banque Populaire in Casablanca;
The recipients allegedly are members of the "Israeli Mob"; New York Investors; Florida Investors; Real Estate Investors; and Levin Feeders.

Scherer has said that his clients and all other investors who weren't complicit in the crime will have their money returned. Due to the extreme negligence, TD Bank is liable. "My goal is to get all the money back for the investors from the bank," Scherer said.

On January 27, 2010 Scherer filed an affidavit alleging that Michael Szafranski was complicit in Rothstein's fraud, receiving almost $6.5 million in "ill-gotten" gains directly from Rothstein.

Shimon Levy and Ovi Levy
Shimon Levy allegedly has had deep ties to Dean Heiser and Israeli organized crime and spent a year in an Israeli prison for hiding a mob figure suspected of two "grisly murders". In 1997, his partner at the Sea Club Resort on Fort Lauderdale beach, Zvika Yuz, was a victim of a murder which remains unsolved. His son, Ovi contacted the Plantation Police Department and began receiving protection during the time Rothstein fled to Morocco.

Banyan Capital 
Banyan Income Fund, a Fort Lauderdale-based hedge fund, invested hundreds of millions. It was run by Rothstein and involves Fort Lauderdale businessman George G. Levin, who reported Rothstein to the U.S. Attorney's Office for "suspicious activity." According to the lawsuit, Frank J. Preve is Chief Operating Officer and kept an office inside Rothstein et al. He is a convicted bank fraud and embezzlement felon. He pleaded guilty to bank embezzlement charges in 1985 and received ten years probation and a $10,000 fine for falsifying loan documents in another fraudulent scheme. Banyon and other Rothstein investors' accounts were held at a Toronto-Dominion Bank branch in Fort Lauderdale.

Abraxas Discala 
Abraxas Discala, a businessman, reportedly raised $30 million through his hedge fund which he invested into Rothstein's scheme.

Partners' income strategy and Rothstein's returns 
The allegations are: George Levin was the general partner ("GP") who solicited each limited partner ("LP") to contribute at least $1 million. Initially, each LP contributed $250,000, subject to periodic capital calls up to the amount of their commitments. They were promised 12% annually (15% for first $100 million), to be paid quarterly. The general partner had to maintain a balance of not less than 10% of all contributions after any quarterly distributions. The general partner also gave a "clawback" guaranty to all LP's equal to their original contributions. LP's could not request redemptions during an initial one-year "lock-up" period and were required to give 90 days' notice for any withdrawals. Redemptions would be paid from the GP's own capital account "to the extent available" with a 10% hold-back, but otherwise, only from the purchased lawsuits settlement stream.

Banyon had paid Rothstein's firm at least $656 million, but the law firm anticipated $1.1 billion over a maximum 24-month period. It allegedly received and reinvested about $500 million. Levin expected to make 40% over 24 months but to only pay out 24%. Rothstein's law firm's IOLTA trust accounts established "for the plaintiff" in the purported litigation settlements were used to fund the phony settlement accounts, after the law firm had paid its overhead, keeping its insolvent operation afloat, which included "gifts" to partners and money given to politicians, charities, and pay for a massive advertising budget, as well as Rothstein's personal lifestyle, over three years, amounting to approximately a $500 million loss.

The interest on the funded IOLTA accounts went to the Florida Bar monthly, which was many millions, based on the Banyon contributions. In its prospectus, Banyon claimed to have a legal opinion that Banyon's interest in the IOLTA trust accounts "perfected automatically on execution of the transfer documents" – that the lawsuit proceeds assignments created by general counsel, David Boden. The LP's were warned that they could be taxed on the Partnership's income and realized gains even if no distributions were made. As long as reinvestments were ongoing, the ponzi scheme was facilitated.

Losses 
1. Venture capitalist Doug Von Allmen's companies' total loss, approximately $105.5 million, through the Banyon Income Fund include:
 The Von Allmen Dynastry Trust, overseen by wife Linda Von Allmen: $7 million.
 D&L Partners, Von Allmen's Missouri company: $45 million.
 Kretschmar: $8 million
 Razorback Funding LLC, a Delaware company: $32 million
 D3 Capital Club LLC, Delaware company: $13.5 million

2. BFMC Investment LLC, owned by Barry Florescue: $2.4 million

3. Socialite art dealer Bonnie Barnett, mother of defendant, Andrew Barnett

4. The family of car dealers, Ed and Ted Morse.

5. Ballamor Capital Management, Radnor, PA: $30 million.

Others 
On November 19, 2009, Rothstein never appeared for a deposition, noticed in the bankruptcy case by investors' attorney John Genovese at Genovese's law office. Banyon and other Rothstein investors' accounts were held at a Toronto-Dominion Bank branch in Fort Lauderdale.

References

External links 
 Video tour of Rothstein's law offices
 USA v. Scott Rothstein: Report Commencing Criminal Action, December 1, 2009
 Federal Charging Information, December 1, 2009 Case No. 09-60331
 Rothstein Plea Agreement, Case 0:09-cr-60331-JIC, filed January 27, 2010
 Disbarment on Consent, filed November 20, 2009
 Amended Civil Complaint filed November 25, 2009, Case No. 09-062943
 Attorney Scherer's Opposition to Motion to Disqualify Counsel for Plaintiffs, filed January 28, 2010
 Amended Complaint for Dissolution and For Emergency Transfer of Corporate Powers to Stuart A. Rosenfeldt, Case No. 09-059301
 Judge's Order Granting Compelling of Bank Records, Case No. 09-059301
 Database of Scott W. Rothstein's Political Contributions
 Database of Scott W. Rothstein's Corporate Interests
 Database of Scott W. Rothstein's registered vehicles
 Database of Scott W. Rothstein's Real Estate Transactions

1962 births
2009 in economics
American money launderers
American money managers
American people convicted of fraud
American prisoners and detainees
20th-century American Jews
American confidence tricksters
Criminal investigation
Disbarred American lawyers
Florida lawyers
Great Recession
Living people
People convicted of racketeering
Prisoners and detainees of the United States federal government
Pyramid and Ponzi schemes
American businesspeople convicted of crimes
21st-century American Jews